Brodie Martin (born 6 November 1988) is a former professional Australian rules footballer who played for the Adelaide Football Club in the Australian Football League (AFL). He was drafted to the Crows with selection 52 in the 2007 Rookie Draft.

AFL career
Martin spent two seasons on the rookie list before being elevated to the primary list before round 16, 2009 as a result of a new rule allowing one free upgrade per team to offset concessions being made to the new  franchise. He was named as an emergency in the game against  and after two teammates were withdrawn due to illness, he was selected for his first game. He kicked a goal with his first kick in AFL football and performed well enough to retain his place in the side for the next week. In that game, against , he seriously injured his left knee while landing awkwardly after a marking contest, and although he played out the match, scans later revealed a rupture to the anterior cruciate ligament in the knee, requiring reconstructive knee surgery and a 10 to 12-month rehabilitation period. After the season, retiring captain Simon Goodwin passed his guernsey number, 36, to Martin.

In 2011 Martin struggled for form, playing only five matches for Adelaide, although he showed good signs late in the season for Sturt. He was kept out of the side by persistent hamstring injuries in 2012, playing seven games. He continued to perform for Sturt, with 12 Magarey Medal votes from limited appearances. 2013 was also ruined by injuries, with Martin only playing two games.

Martin had his best season to date in 2014, playing 17 games including the last 15 in a row. He averaged 16 disposals per game, playing on the wing and at half-forward.

He was delisted at the conclusion of the 2015 season.

Statistics
 Statistics are correct to end of 2014 season

|- style="background:#eaeaea;"
! scope="row" style="text-align:center" | 2009
| style="text-align:center" | 
| 41 || 2 || 1 || 0 || 19 || 15 || 34 || 13 || 4 || 0.5 || 0.0 || 9.5 || 7.5 || 17.0 || 6.5 || 2.0
|- 
! scope="row" style="text-align:center" | 2010
| style="text-align:center" | 
| 41 || 2 || 0 || 0 || 22 || 19 || 41 || 11 || 7 || 0.0 || 0.0 || 11.0 || 9.5 || 20.5 || 5.5 || 3.5
|- style="background:#eaeaea;"
! scope="row" style="text-align:center" | 2011
| style="text-align:center" | 
| 36 || 5 || 0 || 0 || 20 || 28 || 48 || 11 || 8 || 0.0 || 0.0 || 4.0 || 5.6 || 9.6 || 2.2 || 1.6
|- 
! scope="row" style="text-align:center" | 2012
| style="text-align:center" | 
| 36 || 7 || 3 || 5 || 66 || 34 || 100 || 21 || 12 || 0.4 || 0.7 || 9.4 || 4.9 || 14.3 || 3.0 || 1.7
|- style="background:#eaeaea;"
! scope="row" style="text-align:center" | 2013
| style="text-align:center" | 
| 36 || 2 || 0 || 1 || 14 || 4 || 18 || 4 || 2 || 0.0 || 0.5 || 7.0 || 2.0 || 9.0 || 2.0 || 1.0
|- 
! scope="row" style="text-align:center" | 2014
| style="text-align:center" | 
| 36 || 17 || 8 || 15 || 155 || 109 || 264 || 65 || 45 || 0.5 || 0.9 || 9.1 || 6.4 || 15.5 || 3.8 || 2.7
|- class="sortbottom"
! colspan=3| Career
! 35
! 12
! 21
! 296
! 209
! 505
! 125
! 78
! 0.3
! 0.6
! 8.5
! 6.0
! 14.4
! 3.6
! 2.2
|}

References

External links

Adelaide Football Club players
Adelaide Football Club (SANFL) players
1988 births
Living people
Australian rules footballers from South Australia
Sturt Football Club players
Wanderers Football Club players